Chance was a schooner launched in Virginia in 1779, probably under another name. From 1786 she traded between London and Africa, though she may have traded in slaves within African waters. A tornado on 28 March 1789 upset her. Her crew saved themselves, but abandoned her and the 33 slaves onboard. By chance, another vessel later was able to rescue the 11 slaves by then still alive.

Career 
Chance first appeared in Lloyd's Register (LR) in 1786.

In 1787 she reportedly reached the Îles de Los before returning to Portsmouth and then Gravesend on 10 July. On 28 August she again sailed for Africa. By 16 August 1788 she had returned to Gravesend. On 1 October she sailed for Africa.

Fate
Chance, Proudfoot, master, was off Dixcove when a tornado on 28 March 1789 pushed her on her side. The crew was saved in her boats. 

When Chance upset she was carrying 33 slaves and 50 ounces of gold dust. All the whites saved themselves by taking to her boats. They expected that Chance would go to pieces, drowning any slaves still alive as the slaves were locked below decks. Chance drifted out to sea. Fifty-seven hours later she was 20 leagues from where she had upset when , Harvey, master, came upon her. Captain Thomas Harvey sent a boat and some men to investigate the hulk. When the men heard groaning they sent for axes and were able to cut holes in Chance through which they were able to rescue 11 still living slaves. Some of these slaves were chained to dead slaves and the sailors had to cut the arms and legs off the dead to free the still living. A few days later Chance drifted on shore between the towns of Exim and Princess. Inhabitants from the two towns salvaged the gold and fought over the wreckage.

Citations

References
 

1779 ships
Ships built in Virginia
Age of Sail merchant ships of England
London slave ships
Maritime incidents in 1789